Turan Valizade (born on 1 January 2001) is an Azerbaijani professional footballer who plays as a midfielder for Keşla in the Azerbaijan Premier League.

Club career
On 5 May 2019, Valizade made his debut in the Azerbaijan Premier League for Neftçi Baku match against Gabala.

On 21 July 2020, Keşla FK announced the signing of Valizade on one-year long loan.

References

External links
 

2001 births
Living people
Association football midfielders
Azerbaijani footballers
Azerbaijan youth international footballers
Azerbaijan under-21 international footballers
Azerbaijan Premier League players
Neftçi PFK players
Shamakhi FK players